Jaroslav Benák (born 3 April 1962 in Havlíčkův Brod, Czechoslovakia) is an ice hockey player who played for the Czechoslovak national team. He won a silver medal at the 1984 Winter Olympics.

Career statistics

Regular season and playoffs

International

References

External links

1962 births
Calgary Flames draft picks
Chamonix HC players
Czech ice hockey defencemen
EC Peiting players
HC Dukla Jihlava players
Ice hockey players at the 1984 Winter Olympics
Living people
Medalists at the 1984 Winter Olympics
Olympic ice hockey players of Czechoslovakia
Olympic medalists in ice hockey
Olympic silver medalists for Czechoslovakia
Sportspeople from Havlíčkův Brod
PSG Berani Zlín players
SaiPa players
SG Cortina players
Czechoslovak expatriate sportspeople in Italy
Czechoslovak ice hockey defencemen
Czechoslovak expatriate ice hockey people
Czech expatriate sportspeople in Italy
Czech expatriate sportspeople in France
Czech expatriate ice hockey players in Germany
Czechoslovak expatriate sportspeople in Finland
Expatriate ice hockey players in Italy
Expatriate ice hockey players in Finland
Expatriate ice hockey players in France